The Bolivia national beach soccer team represents Bolivia in international beach soccer competitions and is controlled by the Federación Boliviana de Fútbol (Bolivian Football Federation), the governing body for football in Bolivia.

Bolivia first fielded a beach soccer team at the 2014 Bolivarian Beach Games in Huanchaco, Peru. Subsequently, in 2015, La Verde became the final of the 10 members of CONMEBOL to start competing in the Beach Soccer World Cup qualifiers, meaning all 10 were contesting the event together for the first time. Since then, Bolivia have remained an active team, becoming regulars at the major CONMEBOL events of the World Cup qualifiers, Copa América and Liga Sudamericana, however have yet to achieve a podium finish.

Current squad
As of February 2017

Coach: Antonio Gigliotti

Achievements
CONMEBOL qualifiers for the FIFA Beach Soccer World Cup best: 9th place
2015
Copa América de Beach Soccer best: 6th place
2018
Bolivarian Beach Games best: 7th place
2014

Competitive record

FIFA Beach Soccer World Cup

CONMEBOL qualifiers for the FIFA Beach Soccer World Cup

 – Note: 2005 and 2007 were held in a joint championship with CONCACAF

Copa América de Beach Soccer

See also
Bolivia national futsal team

References

External links
Bolivia Profile , at Beach Soccer Worldwide
Bolivia , at Beach Soccer Russia (in Russian)
List of results – '14, '15, '16, '17

South American national beach soccer teams
Beach Soccer